Fort Miami or variant, was the name of several forts in what is now the United States:

Fort Miami (Michigan)
Fort Miami (Indiana), originally Fort des Miamis then Fort St. Philippe
Fort Miami (Ohio), originally Fort Miamis

See also

 
 
 Port Miami (disambiguation)
 Miami (disambiguation)
 Fort (disambiguation)